Sayt'uqucha or Sayt'u Qucha (Quechua suyt'u, sayt'u rectangular, qucha lake, lagoon, "rectangular lake", hispanicized spellings Saitococha, Saytococha) is a lake in Peru located in the Puno Region, Lampa Province, Paratía District. Sayt'uqucha lies between the mountain Yanawara in the northwest and a group of three lakes called Kimsaqucha (Quechua for "three lakes", hispanicized Quimsaccocha) in the southeast.

See also
 Suyt'uqucha
List of lakes in Peru

References

Lakes of Peru
Lakes of Puno Region